Gamine is a term for an mischievous, playful, elfish, and pert girl or young woman.

Gamine may also refer to:

Gamine, a term for female street children (in Colombia, street children of either sex)
Gamine, a brothel founded by Emily Robin in Hull, England in 1898
Gamine, champion American racehorse

See also 
Gamín, a 1977 documentary film about street children in Bogotá